The Johnson-Nielson House, at 351 N. Main St. in Ephraim, Utah, was built in 1895.  It was listed on the National Register of Historic Places in 1982.

It is a one-and-a-half-story Queen Anne-style brick house built by Danish-born contractor Soren J. Johnson.

It has also been known as the Glen and Virginia Nielson House.

References

National Register of Historic Places in Sanpete County, Utah
Queen Anne architecture in Utah
Houses completed in 1895